Pyrgoteles is an unplaced genus of planthoppers in the family Fulgoridae: species can be found in Sub-Saharan Africa.

Species
FLOW lists:
 Pyrgoteles angolensis (Lallemand, 1959)
 Pyrgoteles cristatus Karsch, 1893
 Pyrgoteles funebris (Fennah, 1958)
 Pyrgoteles incarnata (Lallemand, 1959)
 Pyrgoteles machadoi (Lallemand, 1959)
 Pyrgoteles reinhardi (Schmidt, 1911): synonym Apossoda reinhardi
 Pyrgoteles togoensis (Schmidt, 1911): synonym Apossoda togoensis
 Pyrgoteles usambarae (Melichar, 1908)

References

External links

Fulgoridae
Auchenorrhyncha genera
Hemiptera of Africa